The Battle of Amba Sel was fought on 28 October 1531, between the Ethiopians under their Emperor Dawit II, and the forces of Imam Ahmad ibn Ibrahim al-Ghazi of the Adal Sultanate. Imam Ahmad won the battle at Amba Sel, winning him the southern part of Ethiopia. Afterwards, his troops crossed the Walaqa River. The Imam reportedly surprised the Emperor at the battle, where the Emperor was almost captured, a reversal, in the words of R.S. Whiteway, that left Lebna Dengel "never in a position to offer a pitched battle to his enemies."

References

Conflicts in 1531
1531 in Ethiopia
1531 in Africa
Amba Sel
Amba Sel